Benton Lake National Wildlife Refuge is a  National Wildlife Refuge (NWR) in the central part of the U.S. state of Montana.

Location 
Benton Lake NWR includes, Benton Lake, shortgrass prairie and seasonal wetlands, and is nearly surrounded by the Highwood Mountains to the east, Big Belt Mountains to the south, and the Rocky Mountains to the west. Benton Lake NWR is on the western edge of the northern Great Plains and much of the shallow lake is a  wetland.

Benton Lake NWR is the centerpiece of the Benton Lake NWR Complex, which includes Swan Valley Conservation Area, Swan Valley National Wildlife Refuge, Benton Lake Wetland Management District, Blackfoot Valley Conservation Area and the Rocky Mountain Front Conservation Area.

Ecology 

During spring and fall migrations, up to 150,000 ducks, 2,500 Canada geese, 40,000 snow geese, 5,000 tundra swans, and perhaps as many as 50,000 shorebirds use the marsh. On average, 20,000 ducks are produced yearly, while colonies of Franklin's gulls may contain more than 10,000 nests. Shorebirds such as avocets, phalaropes, willets are commonly seen as are diving birds like the grebe. Raptors including bald eagles, golden eagle, prairie falcon, and peregrine falcon have been spotted as well. Of the approximately 240 species of birds recorded on the refuge, nearly 90 are known to nest here. The prairie sections of the refuge provide habitat for burrowing owls and sharp-tailed grouse.

Other Refuge wildlife includes 28 different species of mammals including coyote, muskrat, badger, white-tailed deer, mule deer, and pronghorn.

References

External links

 Benton Lake National Wildlife Refuge - official site

Protected areas of Cascade County, Montana
National Wildlife Refuges in Montana
Wetlands of Montana
Landforms of Cascade County, Montana
Protected areas established in 1929
1929 establishments in Montana